The Gloucestershire Cricket Board (GCB) is the governing body for all recreational cricket in the historic county of Gloucestershire.

From 1999 to 2003 the Board fielded a team in the early rounds of English domestic one-day tournament matches, which had List A status. They played a total of seven List A games, winning two.

See also
 List of Gloucestershire Cricket Board List A players

References

External links
 Gloucestershire Cricket Board main site
 Gloucestershire Cricket Board Play Cricket site

County Cricket Boards
Gloucestershire County Cricket Club